(died 2000) was a Japanese ichthyologist and environmentalist.

He was awarded the Goldman Environmental Prize in 1998 for his efforts on marine protection.

References

People from Nagasaki Prefecture
2000 deaths
Japanese environmentalists
Japanese ichthyologists
1934 births
20th-century Japanese zoologists
Goldman Environmental Prize awardees